Frank O'Neill (1893–1975) was an Australian politician and a member of the New South Wales Legislative Assembly  for a single term between 1953 and 1956. He was a member of the Labor Party (ALP).

O'Neill was born in  Newcastle, New South Wales and was the son of a postmaster. He was educated at Sydney Boys High School. and worked as a clerk in the New South Wales Public Service. O'Neill joined the Labor Party at an early age and, as a member of the Socialization Units, was an opponent of the leadership of Jack Lang in the 1930s. He was the president of Robert Heffron's breakaway Industrial Labor Party in 1938-39 and became a member of the Labor Party's executive when the Industrial Party rejoined the official party in 1939.  O'Neill was elected to parliament as the Labor member for Georges River at the 1953 state election. The incumbent Labor member Arthur Williams left Georges River, which was traditionally a Liberal seat, to contest the safer seat of East Hills. The 1953 election saw Labor make significant gains in marginal seats. At the next election, in 1956, Labor's vote dropped because of divisions within the federal Labor Party and the formation of the DLP. As a result, O'Neill lost the seat to the Liberal party's Douglas Cross, and retired from public life. He did not hold party, parliamentary or ministerial office.

References

 

1893 births
1975 deaths
Members of the New South Wales Legislative Assembly
Australian Labor Party members of the Parliament of New South Wales
20th-century Australian politicians